VT11 may refer to:
 Polikarpov VT-11, a Soviet fighter aircraft prototype
 Torpedo Squadron Eleven, a unit of the United States Navy
 Vermont Route 11
 VT11, a vector graphics terminal containing a PDP-11 processor